Alfred Shea Addis (1832 – September 10, 1886), also known as A.S. Addis, was an American Western itinerant photographer, mostly known for photographs of Kansas, Mexico, and the American Southwest.

Early life

Born in Philadelphia, Pennsylvania in 1832, Addis migrated to Lawrence, Kansas in 1850. He worked as a photographer's assistant for Thomas Short, learning the art of photography and gradually securing his own clients under Short's guidance. Addis later married Short's daughter, Sarah. They had two children, Yda Hillis Addis (born 1857) and Judge Addis (1862–1908). The families were Confederate sympathizers. When the situation in Lawrence became too violent, the Addis's and the Shorts moved to Leavenworth, Kansas, where they lived near the protection of the fort.

Fort Leavenworth 
Addis started his own photography business. He advertised "Photographs, Ambrotypes, Melainotypes. Photographs framed in Superior style. Pins and Lockets filled in best style. Call and give me a trial." At night he managed the Union Theater which he later purchased. As the potential for civil war heated up, the abolitionists increased their stronghold in Leavenworth and violence broke out there when Missouri seceded from the Union in November 1862, prompting Brigadier General James G. Blunt to proclaim martial law. In August 1863 the pro-slavery bushwhacker William Quantrill led a massacre of pro-Union citizens at Lawrence. Addis gave a benefit performance at the Union Theater, with the proceeds to go to the Lawrence victims. In January 1864, abolitionists burned down the Union Theater. The Shorts and the Addises, along with their slaves, fled to northern Mexico.

Mexico 
The Addises and Shorts first went to Chihuahua, where they found other Confederate sympathizers. Addis took photographs of the Mexican landscapes and the indigenous people and sold his cartes de visit to art dealers in New York. When he scouted for wilderness landscapes and exotic vistas to photograph, he often took along his daughter Yda to translate the Indian and Spanish languages to English. Addis moved his family further south into Mexico, looking for new views of native people and the country. By mule train the family migrated to Mazatlán and Hermosillo. After the Civil War ended, Addis took his family aboard the sailing ship The Orizaba for California.

Return to the US and appointment as Deputy United States Marshal
In California, the Addises and the Shorts lived in a house located on Bunker Hill in Los Angeles. Yda and her younger brother attended school in the small Los Angeles School House. The women kept house and took in boarders.

When Addis heard of veins of gold and silver discovered in New Mexico and Nevada, he left Los Angeles for the mines, on the way, he photographed Indian tribes and bought real estate. When he moved to Tucson, Arizona, he was appointed United States Territorial Marshal,. His son Charles also known as Judge, then a young man, joined his father in Tucson. An individual, Mr. Hutchinson, who worked with Addis and had gained his confidence, later swindled Addis and ran away to the Mexican State of Durango. Addis reported "I am after him and will put him in quad." Addis was shot by the thief and died.

As a writer
Alfred Shea Addis a.k.a. A. S. Addis the well known itinerant photographer also wrote travel dispatches for several newspapers. He expressed strong opinions and observations of the people and the politics he experienced while traveling throughout the American Southwest; currently some could consider his language bigoted or even racist. Nevertheless, A. S. Addis ridiculed, and scolded the politicians and the American military. But in the late 19th century the manly use of language discussing politics, and society was different from the current "politically correct" point of view. The following example of A. S. Addis's travel writing was published in the book Evening Express (Los Angeles, California) January 26, 1880:

Legacy
Addis was a prolific photographer and his work appears in many private and public collections; however, cartes de visites, cabinet cards, stereographs and photographs with his imprints are relatively uncommon.

References 

1832 births
1886 deaths
Photographers from Philadelphia
Mexican photographers
People of the American Old West
People from Bunker Hill, Los Angeles